LA-28 is a constituency of Azad Kashmir Legislative Assembly which is currently represented by the Prime Minister of Azad Kashmir Farooq Haider Khan of Pakistan Muslim League (N). It covers the area of Chikkar in Hattian Bala District of Azad Kashmir, Pakistan.

Election 2016

elections were held in this constituency on 21 July 2016.

Muzaffarabad District
Azad Kashmir Legislative Assembly constituencies